Bernardo David Medina (born 14 January 1988) is a Paraguayan international footballer who plays for Atlético Grau, as a goalkeeper.

Career
Medina has played for Libertad since 2007 to 2013. In 2013 to 2016 at General Díaz and in 2017 for Deportivo Capiatá.

References

External links

1988 births
Living people
Paraguayan footballers
Paraguay international footballers
Paraguayan expatriate footballers
Paraguayan Primera División players
Ecuadorian Serie A players
Peruvian Primera División players
Club Libertad footballers
General Díaz footballers
Deportivo Capiatá players
Mushuc Runa S.C. footballers
Sportivo Luqueño players
Association football goalkeepers
People from Carapeguá
Paraguayan expatriate sportspeople in Ecuador
Paraguayan expatriate sportspeople in Peru
Expatriate footballers in Ecuador
Expatriate footballers in Peru